Serine/threonine-protein kinase PAK 6 is an enzyme that in humans is encoded by the PAK6 gene.

PAK6 belongs to the Group II PAK family members. Like other family members, PAK6 is also evolutionary conserved across species.

Discovery 
The PAK6 was originally cloned as an androgen receptor interacting kinase which can be stimulated by androgen receptor but not Rac or Cdc42, like other family members.

Gene and spliced variants 
The human PAK6 gene consists of 16 exons of which 8 exons are used for 5’-UTR splicing to generating 17 transcripts by alternative splicing, and the gene is about 38-kb long. Among PAK6 transcripts, 14 are protein coding RNAs to code four proteins of 681 and 636 amino acids while remaining PAK6 transcripts are non-coding RNAs. There are five transcripts in murine PAK6 gene, of which two transcripts are protein coding and other two non-coding RNAs(Gene from review).

Protein domains 
Following the general structural organization of the group II PAKs, PAK6 also contains a kinase, and a GTPase interacting domain.

Function 

This gene encodes a protein that shares a high degree of sequence similarity with p21-activated kinase (PAK) family members. The proteins of this family are Rac/Cdc42-associated Ste20-like Ser/Thr protein kinases, characterized by a highly conserved amino-terminal Cdc42/Rac interactive binding (CRIB) domain and a carboxyl-terminal kinase domain. PAK kinases are implicated in the regulation of a number of cellular processes, including cytoskeleton rearrangement, apoptosis and the MAP kinase signaling pathway. The protein encoded by this gene was found to interact with androgen receptor (AR), which is a steroid hormone-dependent transcription factor that is important for male sexual differentiation and development. The p21-activated protein kinase 6 gene was found to be highly expressed in testis and prostate tissues and the encoded protein was shown to cotranslocate into the nucleus with AR in response to androgen.

Genetic deletion of PAK6 alone in mice leads to increased body mass. However, PAK6 deletion along with PAK5 impairs the ability of animals to learn and move. PAK6 expression is increased in a rat model of spinal cord injury. PAK6 is also considered a candidate gene for epileptic encephalopathy, and interacts with Parkinson associated gene product leucine-rich repeat kinase 2. PAK6 expression has been found to be overexpressed in prostate cancer, hepatocellular carcinoma, and colon cancer. PAK6 levels have been correlated well with therapeutic resistance to 5-flurouracil, docetaxel, and radiation.

Regulators and interactors 

PAK6 kinase activity is positively regulated by androgen receptor, p38MAPK, 5-fluorouracil and  atypical Rho family GTPase Chp/RhoV. PAK6 expression is negatively regulated by miR-328, miR-429 and miR-23a. PAK6 interacts with junctional protein IQGAP1, E3 ligase Mdm2, and leucine-rich repeat kinase 2 (LRRK2).

Interactions 

PAK6 has been shown to interact with Androgen receptor.

Notes

References